Here are the list of nominees and winners of the Black Reel Award for Best Breakthrough Performance.

Jennifer Hudson, Lupita Nyong'o & Octavia Spencer are the only Black Reel Award winners to win an Academy Award for their breakthrough performances. Quvenzhané Wallis, Barkhad Abdi & Gabourey Sidibe earn Academy Award nominations.

2014 marked the first time that the category was split by gender.

Winners and nominees

References

Black Reel Awards